3000 series may refer to:

Computers 

 CDC 3000 series computers manufactured by Control Data Corporation
 Radeon HD 3000 series video cards developed by ATI

Japanese train types
 Chichibu Railway 3000 series EMU
 Chikuho Electric Railroad 3000 series electric multiple unit operated on the Chikuhō Electric Railroad Line
 Choshi Electric Railway 3000 series EMU
 Fukuoka Subway 3000 series EMU
 Hakone Tozan 3000 series EMU
 Hankyu 3000 series EMU, operated by Hankyu Railway
 Izukyu 3000 series EMU
 Keihan 3000 series EMU
 Keio 3000 series EMU
 Keisei 3000 series EMU
 Nagoya Municipal Subway 3000 series EMU
 Nishitetsu 3000 series EMU
 Odakyu 3000 series EMU
 Odakyu 3000 series SE EMU
 Seibu 3000 series EMU
 Shizuoka Railway A3000 series EMU
 Tobu 3000 series EMU
 Tokyu 3000 series EMU
 TRTA 3000 series EMU
 Yokohama Municipal Subway 3000 series EMU

South Korean train types 
 Seoul Metro 3000 series

Taiwanese train types 
 EMU3000 series

Other 
 Dell Inspiron 3000 series laptop computers

See also

 3000 (disambiguation)